Mauro Roman (born 27 March 1954) is an Italian equestrian.

Biography
Mauro Roman won a team silver medal in eventing at the 1980 Summer Olympics in Moscow. He is the brother of Federico Roman.

Olympic results

See also
Italy at the 1980 Summer Olympics

References

External links
 
 

1954 births
Living people
Equestrians at the 1980 Summer Olympics
Olympic silver medalists for Italy
Olympic medalists in equestrian
Olympic equestrians of Italy
Italian male equestrians
Italian event riders
Medalists at the 1980 Summer Olympics